The Japanese destroyer {{nihongo|Susuki|薄|}} was one of 21 s built for the Imperial Japanese Navy (IJN) in the late 1910s. In 1940, she was converted into a No.31-class patrol boat  and renamed Patrol Boat No.34 (第三十四号哨戒艇, Dai-34-Gō shōkaitei). She was sunk by American aircraft in July 1944.

Design and description
The Momi class was designed with higher speed and better seakeeping than the preceding  second-class destroyers. Susuki was powered by two Brown-Curtis geared steam turbines, each driving one propeller shaft using steam provided by three Kampon water-tube boilers. Their crew consisted of 110 officers and crewmen.

The main armament of the Momi-class ships consisted of three  Type 3 guns in single mounts; one gun forward of the well deck, one between the two funnels, and the last gun atop the aft superstructure. The guns were numbered '1' to '3' from front to rear. The ships carried two above-water twin sets of  torpedo tubes; one mount was in the well deck between the forward superstructure and the bow gun and the other between the aft funnel and aft superstructure.

In 1940, Susuki was converted into a patrol boat. Her torpedo tubes, minesweeping gear, and aft 12 cm gun were removed in exchange for two triple mounts for license-built  Type 96 light AA guns and 60 depth charges.

Construction and career
Susuki, built at the Ishikawajima shipyard in Tokyo, was laid down on 3 May 1920, launched on 21 February 1921 and completed on 5 May 1921. On 1 June 1921, she was assigned to Destroyer Division 15.

Notes

References

1921 ships
Ships built by IHI Corporation
Momi-class destroyers
Destroyers sunk by aircraft
Ships sunk by US aircraft
Maritime incidents in July 1944
World War II shipwrecks in the Pacific Ocean